Bryan Lee-Lauduski (born January 3, 1984) is a former American football quarterback who played one season with the Iowa Barnstormers of the Arena Football League (AFL). He first enrolled at the University of California, Davis before transferring to Southern Oregon University. He attended Carlsbad High School in Carlsbad, California.

Early years
Lee-Lauduski played high school football for the Carlsbad High School Lancers. He was named All-Conference his senior year.

College career
Lee-Lauduski played for the UC Davis Aggies from 2004 to 2005. He  played for the Southern Oregon Raiders from 2006 to 2008. He started all nine games for the Raiders in 2007, completed 187 of 336 passes for 2,083 yards and 17 touchdowns. In 2008, Lee-Lauduski was named to the pre-season NAIA All-Independent second team.

Professional career
Lee-Lauduski played for the Iowa Barnstormers of the AF2 in 2009 and spent most of the year inactive following an early season injury. He signed with the Barnstormers for the 2011 Arena Football League season in  October 2010 after a year away from the team.

References

External links
Just Sports Stats
ESPN profile

Living people
1984 births
Players of American football from San Diego
American football quarterbacks
UC Davis Aggies football players
Southern Oregon Raiders football players
Iowa Barnstormers players
Sportspeople from Carlsbad, California